The final of the Men's 400 metres Freestyle event at the European LC Championships 1997 was held on Friday 1997-08-22 in Seville, Spain.

Finals

See also
1996 Men's Olympic Games 400m Freestyle
1997 Men's World Championships (SC) 400m Freestyle

References
 scmsom results

F